Antoinette-Cécile-Hortense Haudebourt-Lescot (14 December 1784 – 2 January 1845) was a French painter, mainly of genre scenes.  A native of Paris, she began studies with Guillaume Guillon-Lethière, a popular history painter and family friend, at the age of seven; when he was appointed director of the French Academy in Rome in 1807, she followed him, arriving in 1808 and remaining there until 1816.  There she depicted the customs and costumes of Italian peasants in great detail.  Such foreign experience was rare for a woman artist, and influenced much of her work.  She regularly exhibited her work at the Paris Salon, showing some 110 paintings there between 1811 and 1840.

Haudebourt-Lescot married the architect Louis-Pierre Haudebourt in 1820, and died in Paris in 1845.

As a teacher, Haudebourt-Lescot's pupils included the painters Herminie Déhérain and Marie-Ernestine Serret.

References
Notes

Sources
Artnet.com biography

1784 births
1845 deaths
French women painters
Painters from Paris
19th-century French painters
19th-century French women artists